Le Lievre is a surname.  means 'hare'. Notable people with the surname include:

John Le Lievre (born 1956), English squash player
Jules Le Lievre (1933–2016), New Zealand rugby union player
Stan Le Lievre (1920–2003), Australian rules footballer

Surnames of French origin